Myo Myint Kyaw (: born 1985) is a Burmese technopreneur, software engineer, founder and former CEO of Revo Tech, one of Myanmar's largest tech companies. He has been one of the pioneers in Myanmar's tech industry. Myo Myint Kyaw is currently a director of the Earth Group of Companies, a major industrial conglomerate, and the managing director of a subsidiary, Earth Renewable Energy.

Myo Myint Kyaw studied computer science at Middlesex University in the U.K. After nine years in London, he relocated to Singapore, where he worked as a software engineer at ExxonMobil for three years. He returned to Myanmar in 2012 and established Revo Tech, a software and web design company. He began to receive calls from large corporations, followed by Anthem Asia. Two years after starting Revo Tech, Myo Myint Kyaw transformed it into one of Myanmar's largest digital firms. He represents a growing number of young tech enthusiasts in Myanmar. His story is indicative of the challenges that start-ups face in Myanmar, many of which are unique to the country.

In 2016, he founded the Akhayar Media, a local digital media outlet. He sold all of his Revo Tech and Akhayar Media shares at the end of 2018, and Earth Group Companies offered him a director post in 2019.

References

1985 births
Burmese businesspeople
Living people